Puntius spilopterus is a species of ray-finned fish in the genus Puntius. It is sometimes considered conspecific with Puntius brevis. It is found in the Chao Phraya basin in Thailand.

References 

Puntius
Fish described in 1934
Barbs (fish)